Triptych is the third album of Welsh–Australian band Shooting at Unarmed Men. The album consists of three CDs. It was released in Australia on 11 August 2007 and set for a worldwide release on 31 March 2008.

Track listing

CD 1
 " The Best Thing You Can Do Is Die"
 "This Song Comes with a Picture"
 "The Things You Can And Cannot Do"
 "The Conventions of Stopping"

CD 2
 "Boredom Is the Feeling That Everything Is a Waste of Time"
 "Pre-Seated"
 "The Cock-a-Doodle-Doo of Democracy"
 "Full-Proof Plan for Successful Living"

CD 3
 "_ _ _ _ _ _ _ _ _ _ _ " (Peristalsis)
 "Sailing Keeps You Safe
 "Happy Birthday Placenta"
 "The Fortune of Regret"

2007 albums
Too Pure albums